The 2018 Arizona State Legislature elections were held on Tuesday, November 6, 2018. A primary election took place on August 28, 2018. Voters in all 30 legislative districts of the Arizona Legislature elected one state senator and two state representatives. The elections coincided with the elections of other offices, including for governor and the United States Senate.

Members to the State Senate are elected from the same legislative districts as members of the State House of Representatives; however, one Senator represents the constituency, while for the House there are two Representatives per district. In this election, each of the party leaders from both chambers retired, and were elected to different offices.

Overview

Close Races
State Senate Seats where the margin of victory was under 10%:

State House Seats where the margin of victory was under 5%:

Early campaign
In June, a judge ruled that former state senator Don Shooter, who'd been removed from the chamber earlier in 2018, could remain on the ballot for the Yuma district even though Shooter briefly registered to vote in Phoenix.

Independent district 28 senate candidate Mark Syms, husband of representative Maria Syms, was removed from the ballot after a Superior Court judge determined that his petitions contained over 900 forged voter signatures. This followed reports that incumbent district 28 state senator Kate Brophy McGee was supporting house candidate Kathy Petsas.

The most competitive districts in the state included district 28, district 6, and district 18.

Candidates
Winners are in Bold

LD 1
Democrats
State Senate: Jo Craycraft
State House : Ed Gogek
State House : Jan Manolis
Republicans
State Senate: Karen Fann, incumbent
State House : Noel Campbell, incumbent
State House : David Stringer, incumbent

LD 2
Democrats
State Senate: Andrea Dalessandro, incumbent
State House : Rosanna Gabaldón, incumbent
State House : Daniel Hernandez Jr., incumbent
Republicans
State Senate: Shelley Kais
State House : John Christopher Ackerley, former state representative
State House : Anthony Sizer

LD 3
Democrats
State Senate: Sally Ann Gonzales, state representative
State House : Andres Cano
State House : Alma Hernandez
Republicans
State Senate: none
State House : none
Green Party
State House : Beryl Baker

LD 4
Democrats
State Senate: Lisa Otondo, incumbent
State House : Charlene Fernandez, incumbent
State House : Geraldine "Gerae" Peten, incumbent
Republicans
State Senate: Julian Contreraz (Write-in)
State House : none
Green Party
State House : Sara Mae Williams

LD 5
Democrats
State Senate: J'aime Morgaine
State House : Mary McCord Robinson
Republicans
State Senate: Sonny Borrelli, incumbent
State House : Leo Biasiucci
State House : Regina Cobb, incumbent

LD 6
Democrats
State Senate: Wade Carlisle
State House : Felicia French
State House : Bobby Tyler
Republicans
State Senate: Sylvia Tenney Allen, incumbent
State House : Walter "Walt" Blackman
State House : Bob Thorpe, incumbent

LD 7
Democrats
State Senate: Jamescita Peshlakai
State House : Arlando Teller
State House : Myron Tsosie
Republicans
State Senate: JL Mealer
State House : Doyel Shamley

LD 8
Democrats
State Senate: Sharon Girard
State House : Carmen Casillas
State House : Linda C. Gross
Republicans
State Senate: Frank Pratt
State House : David Cook
State House : Thomas "T.J." Shope

LD 9
Democrats
State Senate: Victoria Steele
State House : Randall "Randy" Friese
State House : Pamela Powers Hannley
Republicans
State Senate: Randy Fleenor (write-in candidate)
State House : Ana Henderson

LD 10
Democrats
State Senate: David Bradley
State House : Domingo DeGrazia
State House : Kirsten Engel
Republicans
State Senate: Marilyn Wiles
State House : Todd Clodfelter
Green Party
State House : Joshua Reilly

LD 11
Democrats
State Senate: Ralph Atchue
State House : Hollace Lyon
State House : Marcela Quiroz
Republicans
State Senate: Venden "Vince" Leach
State House : Mark Finchem
State House : Bret Roberts
Green Party
State Senate: Mohammad Arif

LD 12
Democrats
State Senate: Elizabeth Brown
State House : Joe Bisaccia
State House : Lynsey Robinson
Republicans
State Senate: Eddie Farnsworth
State House : Travis Grantham
State House : Warren Petersen

LD 13
Democrats
State Senate: Michelle Harris
State House : Thomas Tzitzura
Republicans
State Senate: Sine Kerr
State House : Timothy "Tim" Dunn
State House : Joanne Osborne

LD 14
Democrats
State Senate: Jaime Alvarez
State House : Bob Karp
State House : Shelley Renne-Leon
Republicans
State Senate: David Gowan
State House : Gail Griffin
State House : Becky Nutt

LD 15
Democrats
State Senate: Kristin Dybvig-Pawelko
State House : Julie Gunnigle
State House : Jennifer Samuels
Republicans
State Senate: Heather Carter
State House : John Allen
State House : Nancy Barto

LD 16
Democrats
State Senate: Benjamin "Ben" Carmitchel
State House : Sharon Stinard
Republicans
State Senate: David Christian Farnsworth
State House : John Fillmore
State House : Kelly Townsend
Green Party
State House : Richard Grayson

LD 17
Democrats
State Senate: Steve Weichert
State House : Jennifer Pawlik
Republicans
State Senate: J.D. Mesnard
State House : Nora Ellen
State House : Jeff Weninger

LD 18
Democrats
State Senate: Sean Bowie
State House : Denise "Mitzi" Epstein
State House : Jennifer Jermaine
Republicans
State Senate: Frank Schmuck
State House : Jill Norgaard
State House : Greg Patterson

LD 19
Democrats
State Senate: Lupe Chavira Contreras
State House : Diego Espinoza
State House : Lorenzo Sierra
Republicans
State Senate: none
State House : none

LD 20
Democrats
State Senate: Douglas Ervin
State House : Hazel Chandler
State House : Christopher "Chris" Gilfillan
Republicans
State Senate: Paul Boyer, state representative
State House : Shawnna Bolick
State House : Anthony Kern incumbent
No Party
State Senate: Doug "Q" Quelland

LD 21
Democrats
State Senate: none
State House : Bradley Hughes
State House : Gilbert Romero
Republicans
State Senate: Rick Gray
State House : Kevin Payne
State House : Tony Rivero
Independents
State Senate: Kathy Knecht

LD 22
Democrats
State Senate: Wendy Garcia
State House : Valerie Harris
State House : Teri Sarmiento
Republicans
State Senate: David Livingston
State House : Frank Carroll
State House : Ben Toma
State House : Ron Ha'o (write in candidate)

LD 23
Democrats
State Senate: Daria Lohman
State House : Eric Kurland
Republicans
State Senate: Michelle Ugenti-Rita, state representative
State House : John Kavanagh, state senator
State House : Jay Lawrence, incumbent
Independents
State Senate: Christopher "Chris" Leone

LD 24
Democrats
State Senate: Lela Alston
State House : Jennifer Longdon
State House : Amish Shah
Republicans
State Senate: Vicki Alger
State House : David Alger Sr.
Libertarians
State House : Christopher Karpurk (write-in)

LD 25
Democrats
State Senate: Kathy Mohr-Almeida
State House : Johnny Martin
Republicans
State Senate: Tyler Pace
State House : Russell W. "Rusty" Bowers
State House : Michelle Udall

LD 26
Democrats
State Senate: Juan Mendez
State House : Isela Blanc
State House : Athena Salman
Republicans
State Senate: Rebecca Speakman
State House : Raymond D. Speakman

LD 27
Democrats
State Senate: Rebecca Rios
State House : Reginald Bolding
State House : Diego Rodriguez
Republicans
State Senate: none
State House : none
No Party
State House : Julian "Jul" Szymanski (write-in)

LD 28
Democrats
State Senate: Christine Porter Marsh
State House : Kelli Butler
State House : Aaron Lieberman
Republicans
State Senate: Kate Brophy McGee
State House : Kathy Pappas Petsas
State House : Maria Syms

LD 29
Democrats
State Senate: Martín J. Quezada
State House : Richard Andrade
State House : Cesar Chavez
Republicans
State Senate: Charles Carpenter (write in candidate)
State House : none

LD 30
Democrats
State Senate: Tony Navarrete
State House : Robert Meza
State House : Raquel Terán
Republicans
State Senate: none
State House : Gary Spears

References

External links
Candidate debates on YouTube

Election results
Arizona Primary Election Results
Arizona General Election Results

Arizona State Legislature